Andrei Galbur (born 5 July 1975) is a Moldovan diplomat who served as Deputy Prime Minister, Minister of Foreign Affairs and European Integration (from 20 January 2016 to 20 December 2017) in Prime Minister Pavel Filip's cabinet. Previously Galbur served as Deputy Minister of Foreign Affairs and European Integration (2015–2016), and Ambassador of Moldova to Russia (2013–2015).

Education
 1997 graduated from the Legal Department of the International Free University of Moldova.
 1998 graduated from Diplomatic Academy of Vienna

Biography
 Since 1995, the attaché, and since 1997 the second secretary, and since 1999 the Councillor of the General Board for Europe and North America;
 From 2000 to 2004 Permanent Secretary at the Embassy of the Republic of Moldova in the Austrian Republic and in parallel, the deputy of the permanent representative at the  international organizations in Vienna;
 From 2004 to 2005 the Head of the General Directorate for International Security;
 From 2005 to 2007, the Head of the Division for Multi-Country Co-operation; 
 Since 2007, the Minister – Councillor, the deputy of the Ambassador, Chargé d'affaires a.i. of the Embassy of the Republic of Moldova in the United States;
 From September 2010 to June 2013, the head of the General Directorate for Multi-Country Cooperation;
 From January 2013 to March 2015, the Ambassador of the Republic of Moldova in the Russian Federation;  
 From March 2015 to January the Deputy Minister of Foreign Affairs and European Integration; 
 Since 20 January 2016 the first deputy Prime-Minister, and the Minister of Foreign Affairs and European Integration.

See also
List of foreign ministers in 2017

References

|-

1975 births
Living people
Ambassadors of Moldova to Russia
Diplomats from Chișinău
Foreign ministers of Moldova